Lepidocottus is a genus of goby that lived  in what is now southern France in the uppermost Oligocene, 24 to 23 million years ago.

References

Eleotridae
Oligocene fish